Giuseppe Milone (born 27 December 1949) is a retired sailor from Italy. Milone represented his country at the 1972 Summer Olympics in Kiel and placed 19th in the Soling, together with Roberto Mottola di Amato and Antonio Oliviero as fellow crew members. Again with Roberto Mottola di Amato, Milone took 5th place at the 1976 Summer Olympics in Kingston, Ontario as helmsman in the Tempest.

References

1949 births
Living people
Sportspeople from Milan
Italian male sailors (sport)
Sailors at the 1972 Summer Olympics – Soling
Sailors at the 1976 Summer Olympics – Tempest
Olympic sailors of Italy